David Ari Leon (born December 12, 1967) is an American music supervisor, composer, songwriter and musician.
 
Leon's first professional music credit  was in 1990 working with Danny Elfman on the feature film Nightbreed. He is best known for writing and supervising music for Marvel Entertainment on titles including Spider-Man and Incredible Hulk. He is a songwriter on the themes to the Marvel series Avengers and Super Hero Squad, and he composed the main title music to the shows Xyber 9 and Mr. Bill Presents.

Featured music

Leon has been featured as a music artist on NPR's syndicated programs Morning Edition and All Things Considered in ten episodes between the years 2005 to 2018.

He was also featured on the album "Rockabye Baby! Baby's Favorite Rock Songs," which was available exclusively at Starbucks March 23 – April 19, 2010. The album reached #3 on Billboard'''s Kids Albums chart, #18 on the Billboard Independent Albums, and #111 on the Billboard Top 200.  It contains a version of the Rolling Stones song Ruby Tuesday that Leon performed and produced for the Rockabye Baby! series, which also features the artists Björk, Journey and Kanye West.

Education and early career

College

In 1990, Leon received a B.A. degree from UCLA in music composition, where he focused on piano performance, film scoring and electronic music production.  While attending the university, he did internships with Academy Award-nominated composers, Mark Isham and Danny Elfman, the latter of which resulted in Leon's first feature film credit on the Clive Barker movie, Nightbreed. Immediately following his completion of university, Leon worked on Days of Our Lives, garnering him an Emmy nomination for "Outstanding Music Director."

Marvel and Fox

In 1994, Leon began working for New World, the parent company of Marvel at that time, as Music Director and composer on the TV series Valley of the Dolls. The following year (1995) was the start of his work for Marvel as composer and music supervisor on the show Spider-Man, along with other titles for Fox Kids.

Leon subsequently held a Vice President of Music title for Fox from 1997 to 2002.  During that time, he received music supervisor credits on many film and television projects for Fox such as the miniseries Les Misérables starring John Malkovich and the primetime series State of Grace, starring Frances McDormand.

Recent works

More recently, Leon performed and arranged songs for a series of albums on Vitamin Records by artists including Neil Young, The Cure, R.E.M. and Pink Floyd. He has also music supervised and written music for a series of interactive and Motion Comics for Marvel, starting with The Astonishing X-Men by Joss Whedon, and including the recent Captain America: The Winter Soldier'', which was the first digital comic to have an interactive soundtrack. Other more recent work for Marvel includes Leon being the music supervisor on eight movies co-produced by Lions Gate including Thor: Tales of Asgard and Invincible Iron Man. 2019 found Leon writing a series of songs for the successful Netflix Original series, Super Monsters. While continuing his TV music work on shows such as the Emmy winning ABC show Sea Rescue and the Emmy nominated ABC show  The Wildlife Docs, Leon also currently scores music for popular titles for EA and other interactive companies.  Games with Leon's music include hit titles such as Contre Jour, Superman, Snoopy Coaster and Woody Woodpecker, which garnered Leon a Hollywood Music in Media Award nomination for his original score to the title. Leon's music was also included in the educational project Kiwaka, a game specifically designed to explore the concept of tangential learning.

References

External links

 
 
 David Ari Leon at Allmusic
 David Ari Leon at Last.FM

1967 births
Composers for piano
Video game composers
American television composers
American male composers
21st-century American composers
American keyboardists
Jewish American composers
Living people
21st-century American male musicians
Vitamin Records artists
21st-century American Jews